α-Terpinene synthase (EC 4.2.3.115) is an enzyme with systematic name geranyl-diphosphate diphosphate-lyase (cyclizing, α-terpinene-forming). This enzyme catalyses the following chemical reaction

 geranyl diphosphate  α-terpinene + diphosphate

The enzyme has been characterized from Dysphania ambrosioides (American wormseed).

References

External links 
 

EC 4.2.3